Easy Living is an album by jazz saxophonist Sonny Rollins, released on the Milestone label in 1977, featuring performances by Rollins with George Duke, Paul Jackson and Tony Williams with Byron Miller and Bill Summers added on one track and Charles Icarus Johnson on two.

Reception

The Allmusic review by Scott Yanow states: "One of Sonny Rollins' better recordings of the 1970s, this spirited Milestone set finds the veteran tenor saxman adopting a thicker and raunchier R&B-ish tone."

Track listing
All compositions by Sonny Rollins except as indicated
 "Isn't She Lovely?" (Stevie Wonder) -  6:39  
 "Down the Line" - 7:59  
 "My One and Only Love" (Robert Mellin, Guy Wood) - 5:05  
 "Arroz con Pollo" -  5:37  
 "Easy Living" (Ralph Rainger, Leo Robin) - 6:09  
 "Hear What I'm Saying" - 9:40  
Recorded at Fantasy Studios, Berkeley, CA, on August 3–6, 1977

Personnel
Sonny Rollins – tenor saxophone (tracks 1,4,5,6), soprano saxophone (tracks 2,3)
George Duke – piano, electric piano
Tony Williams – drums
Paul Jackson – electric bass (tracks 2–6)
Charles Icarus Johnson – guitar (tracks 1–4,6)
Byron Miller – electric bass (track 1)
Bill Summers – congas (track 1)

References

1977 albums
Milestone Records albums
Sonny Rollins albums
Albums produced by Orrin Keepnews